M. Chidananda Murthy (10 May 1931 – 11 January 2020) was a Kannada writer, researcher and historian. He was a well-known scholar in Karnataka specializing in the history of Kannada language and ancient Karnataka. He was also known for his campaign to conserve the monuments Hampi and to secure classical language status to Kannada Language. Murthy also articulated that uniform civil code and an anti-conversion law must be enacted by the Government in India.

Education
Chidananda Murthy obtained his Bachelor of Arts (Honours) degree in 1953 from Mysore University. He obtained his Master of Arts degree in Kannada Literature in 1957, also from Mysore University. During his postgraduate studies, he produced his influential essay Pampa Kavi Mattu Maulya Prasara. In Mysore University, he came under the influence of Kannada literary figures like Kuvempu, PuTeeNa, Raghavachar and historians like S. Srikanta Sastri.  Another literary stalwart TeeNamShri guided Murthy in doctoral research on Kannada inscriptions. His doctoral thesis was titled A cultural study of Kannada inscriptions. He obtained his PhD degree from Bangalore University in 1964.

Career
Murthy was the head of the department of Kannada Bangalore University. He was also associated with Kannada Shakti Kendra. As a historian most of Murthy's work focused on scientific study of the Kannada Inscriptions. He attempted to contextualize inscriptions in their socio cultural setup. He produced many books on the history of Kannada language and Karnataka. He guided many research students.

Works
Vīraśaiva dharma, Bhāratīya saṃskr̥ti   Prakāśana, 2000
Vāgartha  Bāpkō, 1981
Vacana sāhitya 1975
Sweetness and light  Sahithigala Kalavidara Balaga, 1989 [microform]
Saṃśōdhane.  1967
Saṃśōdhana taraṄga. Sarasa Sāhitya Prakāśana, 1966
Pūrṇa sūryagrahaṇa Aibiec Prakāśana, 1982
Pāṇḍitya rasa, Kannaḍa Viśvavidyālaya, 2000
Śūnya sampādaneyannu kuritu.  1962
Madhyakālīna Kannaḍa sāhitya mattu aspr̥śyate Prasārāṅga, Karnāṭaka Viśvavidyālaya, 1985
Liṅgāyata adhyayangaḷu Vāgdēvi Pustakagaḷu, 1986
Kavirājamārga.  1973
Karnāṭaka saṃskr̥ti Kannaḍa Sāhitya Pariṣattu, 1991
Karnāṭaka-Nēpāḷa Prasārāṅga, Kannaḍa Viśvavidyālaya, 2003
Kannaḍāyaṇa Priyadarśini Prakāśana, 1999
Kannada śāsanagaḷa sāmskr̥tika adhyayana.  1966
Hosatu hosatu Kannaḍa Viśvavidyālaya, 1993
Grāmīṇa Bāpko Prakāśana, 1977
Cidānanda samagra sampuṭa Sapna Book House, 2002
Basavanna National Book Trust, India, 1972

Awards
 Rajyothsava award
 Sahitya Akademi Award
 Pampa Award in 2002
 Alva's Nudisiri Award in 2006

Illness and death 
Chidananda Murthy was admitted to a private hospital in Bangalore on 9 January when he suffered difficulties in breathing. The doctors reported blockage of windpipe by dry cough. His son said that Murthy had stopped solid intakes and was only consuming fluids from past few months, due to his varying health conditions.

However Chidananda Murthy died two days later after the admission to the hospital, on 11 January 2020 at around 4am. His mortal remains were kept at the city residence in Bangalore for the people to express their last respects. Several dignitaries like B. S. Yediyurappa, S. L. Bhyrappa, S. Suresh Kumar, V. Somanna expressed their condolences to the veteran's death. The government announced the last rites to be performed with full state honours and respect.

See also
 Kannada
 Kannada literature

References

Sources
 The Hindu – 10 May 2004

External links

People from Davanagere district
20th-century Indian historians
Historians of India
1931 births
2020 deaths
Kannada people
Recipients of the Sahitya Akademi Award in Kannada
Kannada-language writers
University of Mysore alumni
20th-century Indian writers
20th-century Indian male writers